Salek Moallem (also Romanized as Sālak Mo‘allem and Sālek Mo‘allem) is a village in Ahmadsargurab Rural District, Ahmadsargurab District, Shaft County, Gilan Province, Iran. At the 2006 census, its population was 476, in 116 families.

Notes 

Populated places in Shaft County